Kuwait competed at the 2004 Summer Olympics in Athens, Greece, from 13 to 29 August 2004.

Athletics

Kuwaiti athletes have so far achieved qualifying standards in the following athletics events (up to a maximum of 3 athletes in each event at the 'A' Standard, and 1 at the 'B' Standard).

Men
Track & road events

Field events

Women
Track & road events

Judo

Shooting 

Five Kuwaiti shooters qualified to compete in the following events:

Men

See also
 Kuwait at the 2002 Asian Games

References

External links
Official Report of the XXVIII Olympiad
Kuwait Olympic Committee 

Nations at the 2004 Summer Olympics
2004
Summer Olympics